Christian Radich is a Norwegian full-rigged ship, named after a Norwegian shipowner. The vessel was built at Framnæs shipyard in Sandefjord, Norway, and was delivered on 17 June 1937. The owner was The Christian Radich Sail Training Foundation established by a grant from an officer of that name.

Description
The vessel is a full-rigged  steel hull, 62.5 m long, with an overall length of 73 m  including the bowsprit and a maximum width of 9.7 m. She has a draught of about 4.7 meters and a displacement at full load of 1050 tonnes. Under engine power, Christian Radich reaches a top speed of 10 knots, while she can make up to 14 knots under sail. The crew is 18 all together. She can accommodate 88 passengers.

The class society of the vessel is Det Norske Veritas, DNV, and she is built to +1A1, E0.

History
Christian Radich is well known through the international release in 1958 of the Cinemiracle widescreen movie Windjammer. Christian Radich sailed to the United States in 1976 as part of the Bicentennial Celebration, and partook in the Operation Sail parade in New York Harbor on 4 July 1976. The ship also appeared as herself in the 1970s BBC TV series The Onedin Line, as one of James Onedin's ships.

The vessel was built for training sailors for the Norwegian merchant navy, and did so for many years. Since 1999 the ship has been on the charter market as well as sailing with paying trainees to foreign ports on summer trips, participating in the Cutty Sark Tall Ships' Race and large sail events in European ports. She won on corrected time in both Class A and overall tall ship in 2007, and was the only class A vessel that crossed the finish line.

Christian Radich won the first race of the Tall Ships Race 2010 in Class A, from Antwerp to Skagen in Denmark, a distance of  just under 2 days with an impressive average speed of 10.2 knots, with the corrected time of 1 day 4 hours 29 minutes and 44 seconds, and won the overall race 2010, making this her 5th victory in the Tall ships Race.

Footnotes

External links 

Christian Radich official web site

About the movie Windjammer

Photos and videos 
 360° QTVR fullscreen panoramas of Christian Radich

Culture in Oslo
Individual sailing vessels
Training ships
Ships built in Sandefjord
Tall ships of Norway
Windjammers
1937 ships
Full-rigged ships
Naval ships of Norway captured by Germany during World War II